Rierguscha is a genus of beetles in the family Cerambycidae, containing the following species:

 Rierguscha bicolor Viana, 1970
 Rierguscha florida Napp & Martins, 2006
 Rierguscha viridipennis (Bruch, 1925)

References

Unxiini